Luis Fernández Ochoa (born 13 January 1965) is a Spanish former alpine skier who competed in the 1984 Winter Olympics and in the 1988 Winter Olympics.

References

1965 births
Living people
Spanish male alpine skiers
Olympic alpine skiers of Spain
Alpine skiers at the 1984 Winter Olympics
Alpine skiers at the 1988 Winter Olympics
20th-century Spanish people